The Bayshore Bomb Scoring Site ("base facility identifier" 26001F) is a Formerly Used Defense Site (FUDS) that was used as a Strategic Air Command radar station for Radar Bomb Scoring.  The site was activated in 1963 at Charlevoix, Michigan by Detachment 6 of the 1CEVG's Radar Bomb Scoring Division.  Det 6 moved to the site from Ironwood, Michigan,* and was tracking the 1971 Big Rock Point B-52 crash.

The Bayshore site was rebuilt after a 1967 television fire, closed in 1985.

References
The Ironwood RBS site was established when the unit and equipment moved from Guam (10th RBS Squadron Det 12) in July 1960.  

Installations of the United States Air Force in Michigan
United States automatic tracking radar stations
Military installations established in 1963
Military installations closed in 1985
1963 establishments in Michigan
1985 disestablishments in Michigan